The Catholic Church in Indonesia is composed of 10 archdioceses and 27 dioceses which form 10 ecclesiastical provinces. Indonesia also has a military ordinariate.

List of dioceses in Indonesia

The Bishops' Conference of Indonesia

Ecclesiastical Province of Ende
Archdiocese of Ende
Diocese of Denpasar
Diocese of Larantuka
Diocese of Maumere
Diocese of Ruteng

Ecclesiastical Province of Jakarta
Archdiocese of Jakarta
Diocese of Bandung
Diocese of Bogor

Ecclesiastical Province of Kupang
Archdiocese of Kupang
Diocese of Atambua
Diocese of Weetebula

Ecclesiastical Province of Makassar
Archdiocese of Makassar
Diocese of Amboina
Diocese of Manado

Ecclesiastical Province of Medan
Archdiocese of Medan
Diocese of Padang
Diocese of Sibolga

Ecclesiastical Province of Merauke
Archdiocese of Merauke
Diocese of Agats
Diocese of Jayapura
Diocese of Manokwari-Sorong
Diocese of Timika

Ecclesiastical Province of Palembang
Archdiocese of Palembang
Diocese of Pangkal-Pinang
Diocese of Tanjungkarang

Ecclesiastical Province of Pontianak
Archdiocese of Pontianak
Diocese of Ketapang 
Diocese of Sanggau
Diocese of Sintang

Ecclesiastical Province of Samarinda
Archdiocese of Samarinda 
Diocese of Banjarmasin
Diocese of Palangkaraya
Diocese of Tanjung Selor

Ecclesiastical Province of Semarang
Archdiocese of Semarang
Diocese of Malang
Diocese of Purwokerto
Diocese of Surabaya

Military Ordinariate
Military Ordinariate of Indonesia

See also
Religion in Indonesia

External links 
Catholic-Hierarchy entry.
GCatholic.org.

Catholic dioceses
Indonesia